Marla Streb (born June 24, 1965) is an American professional cyclist and was inducted in the mountain bike hall of fame in 2013.  She has won a World Cup downhill in 2005 (Austria), twice won the Single Speed World Championship in 1999 and 2006 and also won the X-Games in 1999.  Streb has written and published two books, appeared on the cover of Outside Magazine, and has been featured on network television and movies such as the IMAX movie Top Speed.

Marla is the founder and owner of Baltimore, MD's first and only bicycle-cafe, called HandleBar Cafe.  Streb also works as the PR and media liaison with the all-women's professional trade team, The Clif Pro Team, and contracts as an LCI instructor with Bike Maryland, a non-profit cycling advocacy organization.

Streb currently owns a natural-surface trail design company called Streb Trail Systems in Costa Rica, and runs a mountain bike touring company called Jungle Mountain Bike Tours in Montezuma, Costa Rica

Palmarès

1998
 X GAMES Champion – Crested Butt, CO
 1st, NORBA Series – Seven Springs, PA
 1st, NORBA Series Finals – Durango, Colorado, USA
 1st, NORBA Series – Mt. Snow, VT
 1st, Sea Otter Classic – Monterey, CA
1999
 Single Speed World Champion – Rancho Cucamonga, CA, USA
2000
 1st NORBA Series – Mammoth Mt., CA
 1st NORBA Series – Deer Valley, UT
 3rd, UCI World Championships – Sierra Nevada, Spain
 3rd, UCI World Cup – Arai, Japan
2001
 1st, NORBA Series, Big Bear Lake, CA
 1st, Sea Otter Classic, Monterey, CA
2003
 U.S. National Downhill Champion
 World Cup Downhill Finals Champion- Kaprun, Austria
 1st NORBA Series – Snowshoe, W VA
 1st NORBA Series – Mt. Snow, VT
 3rd, UCI World Cup – Mount Ste. Anne, Canada
2004
 U.S. National Downhill Champion
 U.S. National Super-Downhill Champion
2005
 Single Speed World Champion – State College, PA
 1st, Sea Otter Classic- Single Speed Cross Country
 1st, NORBA Super-Downhill – Arizona
 1st, Crankworx Enduro Downhill, Whistler-Blackcomb, BC
2014
 1st, Mayhem Enduro – The Wilds, Ohio
 1st, OverMountain Enduro- Northfield, NH
2015
 1st, Mayhem Enduro- The Wilds, Ohio
 4th,  Sea Otter Classic Enduro- Monterey, CA
2016
 1st, Mayhem Enduro- The Wilds, Ohio

External links
 brief bio
 Cafe
 bike advocacy
 Official Website
 A page about Marla on the website for the film Top Speed

1965 births
Living people
American female cyclists
Downhill mountain bikers
Single-speed mountain bikers
Cross-country mountain bikers
University of Maryland, Baltimore County alumni
American mountain bikers
21st-century American women
Cyclists from California
Cyclists from Maryland